William Herbert St Quintin    (1851-1933) was a British naturalist.

Biography
St Quintin was educated at Eton College and Christ Church, Oxford. He was a Justice of the peace from 1875 until his death, and served as the High Sheriff of Yorkshire in 1899 and Deputy Lieutenant of the East Riding.

St Quintin was a keen ornithologist, keeping a private collection of birds including Great bustards, a secretary bird, and a tūī. He was a founding member of the Avicultural Society in 1895, president of the Yorkshire Naturalists' Union in 1909, a member of the British Ornithologists' Union from 1883 to 1922 and also served on the council of the Royal Society for the Protection of Birds from 1908–1919. St. Qunitin was the President of the Yorkshire Philosophical Society from 1914 until his death in 1933, and also served as the Honorary Curator of Zoology.

Personal life
In 1885 he married Violet Helen Duncombe and they had one daughter, Margery Violet St Quintin.

Select publications
St Quintin, W.H., 1905. "The breeding of Pterocles exustus". Avicultural Magazine (New Series) 3, pp. 64–66.
St Quintin, W.H., 1907. "Leaf-insects in captivity". The Entomologist 40, pp. 73–75.
St Quintin, W.H., 1908. "Notes on the life history of the leaf insects". Naturalist, 618, pp. 235–238.
St Quintin, W.H., 1910. "Ants and Lycaenid Larvae", Entomologists' Record 22, pp. 72–73.

See also
Scampston Hall, the estate owned by the St Quintin family
St Quintin baronets

References

1851 births
British curators
1933 deaths
British ornithologists
Yorkshire Museum people
Members of the Yorkshire Philosophical Society
Deputy Lieutenants of the East Riding of Yorkshire
Fellows of the Zoological Society of London
Members of British Ornithologists' Union
People educated at Eton College
Alumni of Christ Church, Oxford
English justices of the peace